The Chalet School is a series of 64 school story novels by Elinor M. Brent-Dyer, initially published between 1925 and 1970. The fictional school was initially located in the Austrian Tyrol, before it was moved to Guernsey in 1939 following the rise to power of the Nazi Party, and again to Herefordshire following the Nazi invasion of the Channel Islands. It later moved to a fictional island off the coast of Wales, and finally to Switzerland.

Plot
The Chalet School is founded in 1925 by Madge Bettany when her brother has to return to his job in the Forestry Commission in India. She comes to the conclusion that starting a school would be a convenient way to generate some much-needed income, while also looking after her infirm younger sister Joey. Finding that suitable locations in England would be too expensive for her plans, she decides to look abroad, and finally settles on a large chalet in the Austrian Tyrol, conveniently providing a helpful climate for Joey's recuperation. Within a few years a sanatorium is built not far from the school, where tuberculosis patients convalesce. The founder, Dr Jem Russell, along with Dr Jack Maynard, provides assistance to members of the school and the two Doctors eventually marry Madge and Joey respectively. Robin Humphries is also a main character, until she leaves the Chalet school to go to Oxford and later becomes a nun. The books then follow a variety of characters, including Daisy Venables, Bride Bettany and Gay Lambert, until Mary-Lou Trelawney comes to the school, and becomes the main character for several books. After she leaves school, in the later books, Joey's triplets become main characters.

Throughout the series, various girls arrive at the school with personal problems, bad attitudes or behavioural issues. As a result of the ministrations of better-behaved classmates and the school mistresses, they tend to discover the error of their ways and become model pupils.  This formula of a troublesome new girl who reforms and conforms is most common in the later books.

Reception
As with contemporary series of school stories by other authors, the Chalet School books acquired a following of readers who tried to collect each new novel as it came out. Its more exotic setting set it slightly apart from other British series in the same genre. It is the longest of any such novel series.

Book details

Hardback
Chalet School books were originally published in hardback between 1925 and 1970 by W. & R. Chambers.

Paperback
The novels were reissued in paperback format between 1967 and 1995. Usually with updated language. Some were more or less uncut, but many others were abridged to various extents, including chapters deleted from some titles. A few were split into two paperback volumes, and several were retitled.

Additional books

Books by other authors

Many authors have written books set in the Chalet School universe. Some of them follow on from the last book of the series, and others attempt to fill in some of the "gaps" in the earlier years of the school.  All books are published by Girls Gone By Publishers (formerly Friends of the Chalet School) unless otherwise stated.

Prequel

This title describes the events which led to the founding of the Chalet School.

Before the Chalet School: The Bettanys on the Home Front – Helen Barber (2015)
The Bettanys of Taverton High – Helen Barber (2008)
Last Term at Taverton High – Helen Barber (2018)

Fill in novels

This list contains all fill ins that have been published that fit within the time-scale of the Chalet School universe written by Elinor Brent-Dyer (i.e. not preceding or following it). The second title listed is the book that immediately precedes the respective fill in unless otherwise stated.

 Joey and Patricia: A Reunion in Guernsey – Helen McClelland (2000) Published by The New Chalet Club – The Chalet School in Exile
 Gillian of the Chalet School – Carol Allan (2001, 2006, 2018) – The New Chalet School (and A United Chalet School)
 The Chalet School and Robin – Caroline German (2003, 2012) – The Chalet School Goes to It
 A Chalet School Headmistress – Helen Barber (2004, 2017) – Same term as The Mystery at the Chalet School
 Visitors for the Chalet School – Helen McClelland (2004) First published by Bettany Press and later by Collins – The Princess of the Chalet School
 Hilda Annersley: Headmistress – Lesley Green (2005) Published by Matador – Gay From China at the Chalet School
 Peace Comes to the Chalet School – Katherine Bruce (2005) – The Chalet School and Rosalie
 Juliet of the Chalet School – Caroline German (2006) – The Guides of the Chalet School
 Two Chalet School Girls in India – Priyadarshini Narendra (2006) Published by Bettany Press- The New Chalet School (and A United Chalet School)
 Cornelia of the Chalet School – Jackie Roberts (2009) Published by Yersinia Press – Three go to the Chalet School
 The Guides of the Chalet School – Jane Berry (2009) – Jo of the Chalet School
 Deira Joins the Chalet School – Caroline German (2010) – The Guides of the Chalet School
 A Difficult Term for the Chalet School – Lisa Townsend (2011) – Three Go to the Chalet School
 The Müller Twins at the Chalet School – Katherine Bruce (2012) – Jo Returns to the Chalet School
 Champion of the Chalet School – Adrianne Fitzpatrick (2014) – Peace Comes to the Chalet School
 Surprises for the Chalet School – Jackie Roberts (2014) Published by Yersinia Press – Same term as Peggy of the Chalet School
 Joey and Co in Canada – Jackie Roberts (2016) Published by Yersinia Press – follows Carola storms the Chalet School
 Juniors of the Chalet School – Katherine Bruce (2016) – Same term as The Princess of the Chalet School
 Sisters at the Chalet School – Amy Fletcher (2017) – The Chalet School and Rosalie
 The Chalet School Annexe – Adrianne Fitzpatrick (2018) – Same term as The Exploits of the Chalet Girls
 The Chalet School and Cornelia – Katherine Bruce (2019) – Same term as The Head Girl of the Chalet School
 A Refuge for the Chalet School – Amy Fletcher (2019) – Same time period as The Chalet School in Exile
 The Bettany Twins and the Chalet School - Helen Barber (2020) - Same time period as Tom Tackles the Chalet School and The Chalet School and Rosalie
 The Chalet School in Guernsey – Katherine Bruce (2020) – The Chalet School in Exile
 The Chalet School Returns to the Alps - Lisa Townsend (2021) - Same term as The Chalet School and Barbara
 A Guernsey Girl at the Chalet School - Amy Fletcher (2021) - Sisters at the Chalet School
 Flight of a Chalet School Girl - Katherine Bruce (2022) - Ends during The Highland Twins at the Chalet School
 Maeve of the Chalet School - Helen Barber (2022) - Same term as Shocks for the Chalet School and The Chalet School in the Oberland

Sequels

The first book follows some of the Chalet School characters, though it is not set in the School itself. It is not recommended for younger readers.

 Chalet Girls Grow Up – Merryn Williams (1998) Published by Plas Gwyn Books

These books follow on after Prefects of the Chalet School

 New Beginnings at the Chalet School – Heather Paisley (1999 Published by Friends of the Chalet School and 2002 Published by GGB)
 Nicola Goes To The Oberland – Josephine M. Hardman (2010) Published by Blurb (takes place over the year immediately following New Beginnings)
 The Chalet School Librarian – Pat Willimott (2005) Published by Matador

Collections

A collection of stories that takes place at various points throughout the series:

The Chalet School Christmas Story Book - Various authors (2007) 
Chalet School World – Helen Barber (2013)

References

External links
 The SDL - This has now long been just a read-only archive of fanfiction for unknown (presumably technical) reasons.
 Lime Green Musing - This forum is the other dedicated Chalet School fanfiction site, still totally functional for reading, writing, and commenting on stories.
 Friends of the Chalet School
 Girls Gone By Publishers
 The New Chalet Club

Series of children's books
Novel series
Fictional schools
British children's novels
Novels set in schools